Mihailo Perović (Cyrillic: Михаило Перовић, born 23 January 1997) is a Montenegrin professional footballer who plays as a striker.

Club career

Újpest
At the age of 18, he signed his first professional contract with Hungarian team Újpest in February 2015. He made his NB I debut with Újpest under coach Nebojša Vignjević on 21 March 2015 in a game against Honvéd. In 2016 he suffered an ACL injury which kept him from playing for six months.

Voždovac
Perović signed with Serbian team Voždovac in July 2017. He saw little playing time at Voždovac and scored his only goal in a 2–1 win against Borac Čačak on 5 August 2017.

Budućnost Podgorica
Perović signed with his childhood team Budućnost Podgorica in July 2018. On 30 May 2019, he scored a hat-trick against Lovćen in the 2019 Montenegrin Cup Final, which Budućnost won 4–0. On 25 July 2019, he scored a goal in a 3–1 loss against Ukrainian club Zorya Luhansk in the second qualifying round of the 2019–20 UEFA Europa League.

Zorya Luhansk
On 23 January 2020, Perović signed a two-and-a-half-year contract with Ukrainian club Zorya Luhansk.

Olimpija Ljubljana
On 26 January 2021, Perović joined Slovenian team Olimpija Ljubljana, signing a contract until summer 2023.

Honours
Budućnost Podgorica
Montenegrin Cup: 2019

Olimpija Ljubljana
Slovenian Cup: 2020–21

References

External links
 
 Mihailo Perović at Football Association of Montenegro

1997 births
Living people
Footballers from Podgorica
Montenegrin footballers
Association football forwards
Montenegro youth international footballers
Montenegro under-21 international footballers
Újpest FC players
FK Voždovac players
FK Budućnost Podgorica players
FC Zorya Luhansk players
NK Olimpija Ljubljana (2005) players
FK Iskra Danilovgrad players
Nemzeti Bajnokság I players
Serbian SuperLiga players
Montenegrin First League players
Ukrainian Premier League players
Slovenian PrvaLiga players
Montenegrin expatriate footballers
Expatriate footballers in Hungary
Montenegrin expatriate sportspeople in Hungary
Expatriate footballers in Serbia
Montenegrin expatriate sportspeople in Serbia
Expatriate footballers in Ukraine
Montenegrin expatriate sportspeople in Ukraine
Expatriate footballers in Slovenia
Montenegrin expatriate sportspeople in Slovenia